Nimbanahita is a genus of wandering spiders containing the single species, Nimbanahita montivaga. It was  first described by A. Henrard & Rudy Jocqué in 2017, and is only found in Guinea.

References

External links

Ctenidae
Monotypic Araneomorphae genera